Chapaev is a village in the Chüy District of the Chüy Region in Kyrgyzstan. Its population was 871 in 2021. The village belongs to Kegeti rural community (ayyl aymagy).

References

Populated places in Chüy Region